Mattheus de Andrade Gama de Oliveira, sometimes known as just Mattheus Oliveira or Mattheus (born 7 July 1994), is a Brazilian footballer who plays as an attacking midfielder for Portuguese club Farense.

Early life
Mattheus Oliveira is the son of former Brazilian player Bebeto, and became widely known just days after his birth due to his father's 'cradle-rocking' celebration on scoring a crucial goal against the Netherlands in the 1994 FIFA World Cup quarterfinals.

Career

Flamengo
Mattheus Oliveira made his professional debut for Flamengo on 3 February 2012, as a 77th-minute substitute for Lucas Quintino in a goalless home Campeonato Carioca match against Olaria; it was his only appearance of the season. On 17 June, he made his Campeonato Brasileiro Série A debut, coming on in added time for Ibson in a 1–0 home win over Santos. He made 11 appearances in that campaign, with three starts, the first of which was a goalless draw against Portuguesa at the Estádio Olímpico Nilton Santos on 27 July.

Mattheus Oliveira played five games as Flamengo won the 2014 Campeonato Carioca.

Estoril
On 30 January 2015, Mattheus Oliveira was loaned to Estoril in Portugal's Primeira Liga. He began playing regularly in 2015–16, scoring his first professional goals on 7 March with two in a 3–1 win at Rio Ave, and repeated the feat 13 days later in a 3–0 win at Académica de Coimbra.

Sporting
In May 2017, Mattheus Oliveira signed a five-year deal with Sporting CP. The buyout clause was set at €60 million. In November 2020, the €2 million transfer fee was investigated by Portuguese courts for being double the player's valuation by the website Transfermarkt.

Mattheus Oliveira made his Sporting debut on 19 September 2017 in a goalless Taça da Liga group game at home to Marítimo, as a starter. He also made a brief appearance in the Taça de Portugal against Famalicão and played one game in the UEFA Champions League in November against Olympiacos.

On 23 January 2018, Mattheus Oliveira was loaned to fellow league team Vitória de Guimarães for the rest of the season.

Mattheus Oliveira returned to his homeland's top flight on 30 September 2020, being lent to Coritiba until the following June. He played 12 games for the Coxo, scoring once at the end of a 3–1 loss on his return to Flamengo on 21 November. He missed the 2021 Campeonato Paranaense with a thigh injury.

Mattheus Oliveira cancelled his contract with Sporting by mutual consent in September 2021.

Mafra
On 25 January 2022, Mattheus Oliveira signed an 18-month deal with Liga Portugal 2 outfit Mafra.

Farense
In January 2023, Mattheus signed with Farense in Liga Portugal 2.

Career statistics
Correct

Honours
Flamengo
Campeonato Carioca: 2014

References

1994 births
Living people
Footballers from Rio de Janeiro (city)
Brazilian footballers
Brazil under-20 international footballers
Brazil youth international footballers
Brazilian expatriate footballers
Campeonato Brasileiro Série A players
Primeira Liga players
Liga Portugal 2 players
CR Flamengo footballers
G.D. Estoril Praia players
Sporting CP footballers
Vitória S.C. players
Coritiba Foot Ball Club players
C.D. Mafra players
S.C. Farense players
Expatriate footballers in Portugal
Brazilian expatriate sportspeople in Portugal
Association football midfielders